Cleaning is the process of removing unwanted substances, such as dirt, infectious agents, and other impurities, from an object or environment. Cleaning is often performed for aesthetic, hygienic, functional, environmental, or safety purposes. Cleaning occurs in many different contexts, and uses many different methods. Several occupations are devoted to cleaning.

Contexts
Cleaning occurs in various commercial, domestic, personal, and environmental contexts, which differ in scale and requirements.

 Commercial cleaning, in business or other commercial settings
 Terminal cleaning, in healthcare settings
 Environmental remediation, the removal of pollution or contaminants from the natural environment
 Housekeeping, including spring cleaning
 Hygiene, including personal grooming

Methods

Cleaning is broadly achieved through mechanical action and/or solvent action; many methods rely on both processes.

 Washing, usually done with water and often some kind of soap or detergent
 Pressure washing, using a high-pressure stream of water
 Wet cleaning, methods of professional laundering that avoid the use of chemical solvents
 Abrasive blasting, typically used to remove bulk material from a surface, may be used to remove contaminants as well
 Acoustic cleaning, the use of sound waves to shake particulates loose from surfaces
 Ultrasonic cleaning, using ultrasound, usually from 20–400 kHz
 Megasonic cleaning, a gentler mechanism than ultrasonic cleaning, used in wafer, medical implant, and industrial part cleaning
 Carbon dioxide cleaning, a family of methods for parts cleaning and sterilization using carbon dioxide in its various phases
 Dry cleaning of clothing and textiles, using a chemical solvent other than water
 Flame cleaning of structural steel, with an oxyacetylene flame
 Green cleaning, using environmentally friendly methods and products
 Plasma cleaning, using energetic plasma or dielectric barrier discharge plasma created from various gases
 Sputter cleaning, performed in a vacuum by using physical sputtering of the surface
 Steam cleaning, in both domestic and industrial contexts
 Thermal cleaning, in industrial settings, involving pyrolysis and oxidation
 Ultraviolet germicidal irradiation, which destroys microorganisms; used extensively in the medical and food industries

Cleaning by item

Some items and materials require specialized cleaning techniques, due to their shape, size, location, or the material properties of the object and contaminants.

Buildings and infrastructure
 Beach cleaning
 Carpet cleaning
 Chimney cleaning
 Crime scene cleanup
 Exterior cleaning
 Floor cleaning
 Graffiti removal
 Roof cleaning
 Silo cleaning
 Street cleaning

Other items
 Coin cleaning
 Conservation and restoration of cultural property, which often involves careful cleaning
 Jewellery cleaning
 Laundry, the washing of clothes and other textiles
 Parts cleaning, in industry
 Pot washing, in food service
 Teeth cleaning
 Tube cleaning

Occupations involving cleaning
Several occupations involve cleaning, either in their entirety or among other duties.
 Cleaner
 Housekeeper (domestic worker)
 Janitor
 Maid

See also

General
 Cleaning (disambiguation), for other uses of the term
 Cleanliness, an abstract concept for a state that may be achieved by cleaning
 Cleaning agent, substances used in cleaning
 Contamination control, of which cleaning is a part

Biology and health
 Cleaning symbiosis, among living creatures
 Hygiene, a set of practices performed for the preservation of health
 Sanitation, techniques to protect human health by providing a clean environment
 Sterilization (microbiology), the elimination or deactivation of biological agents

Organizing
 Professional organizing, improvement of organizing systems and processes
 Sorting, any process of arranging items systematically

Technologies
 Cleanroom, a room with low levels of particulates, used in specialized manufacturing or research
 Automated pool cleaner
 Central vacuum cleaner
 Robotic vacuum cleaner
 Self-cleaning floor
 Self-cleaning glass
 Self-cleaning oven

Other contexts
 Cleaning event, in which solar panels on planetary rovers are cleaned by wind
 Cleaning validation, used to assure that manufacturing residues are removed

Broad-concept articles